Alexander of Yugoslavia may refer to:

 King Alexander I of Yugoslavia (1888–1934), reigned 1921 to 1934
 Prince Alexander of Yugoslavia (1924–2016), son of Prince Regent Paul of Yugoslavia
 Alexander, Crown Prince of Yugoslavia (born 1945), current pretender
 Prince Alexander of Yugoslavia (born 1982), son of Crown Prince Alexander of Yugoslavia

See also
 Alexandra of Yugoslavia (1921–1993)